Chosen or The Chosen may refer to:

The chosen ones
Chosen people, people who believe they have been chosen by a higher power to do a certain thing including
Jews as the chosen people

Books
The Chosen (Potok novel), a 1967 novel by Chaim Potok
 The Chosen, a 1997 novel by L. J. Smith
The Chosen (Pinto novel), a 1999 novel by Ricardo Pinto
The Chosen (Karabel book), a book by Jerome Karabel
Chosen (Dekker novel), a 2007 novel by Ted Dekker
Chosen (Cast novel), a novel in the House of Night fantasy series

Film and television
Holocaust 2000, also released as The Chosen, a 1977 horror film starring Kirk Douglas
The Chosen (1981 film), a film based on Potok's novel
The Chosen (2015 film), a film starring YouTube personality Kian Lawley
The Chosen (2016 film), by Antonio Chavarrías, based on the murder of Leon Trotsky in 1940
The Chosen (TV series), by Dallas Jenkins, based on the life of Jesus Christ (2017–)
Chosen (2016 film), by Jasmin Dizdar, a World War II thriller set in Hungary
Chosen (American TV series), starring Milo Ventimiglia
Chosen (Danish TV series), a 2022 TV series produced by Netflix
"Chosen" (Buffy the Vampire Slayer), an episode of Buffy the Vampire Slayer
"Chosen" (Once Upon a Time), an episode of Once Upon a Time
"Chosen" (The Twilight Zone), an episode of The Twilight Zone

Places
Chosen or Hosen, a moshav in northern Israel
Chōsen, the Japanese name for the Korean state of Joseon from 1392 to 1897; since 1949 used only for 
Chōsen, official name of Korea during the period of Japanese rule, 1910-1945
Chosen, Florida

Other uses
Chosen (album), an album by Vanessa Bell Armstrong
Chosen (EP), an extended play by Måneskin
"Chosen" (Måneskin song), 2017
"Chosen" (Blxst song), 2020
"The Chosen", a song by Unearth from the album The March, 2008
Blood II: The Chosen, sequel to the video game Blood

See also
Adaptive chosen-ciphertext attack, an interactive form of chosen-ciphertext attack
Chosen-ciphertext attack, an attack model
Chosen-plaintext attack, an attack model
Indifferent chosen-ciphertext attack, a form of chosen-ciphertext attack
The Chosen One (disambiguation)
Battle of Chosin Reservoir, November - December 1950, part of the Korean War
Chozen (disambiguation)